George Bankyntiewlang Lyngdoh is a member of Meghalaya Legislative Assembly from Umroi constituency. Lyngdoh won the seat in 2018 assembly elections. He is the son of former Chief Minister of Meghalaya Evansius Kek Mawlong. He is the Former General Secretary, Meghalaya Editor's And Publisher’s Association and is the President of the Umroi Block Congress Committee.

Lyngdoh was born September 11, 1978 and has a Bachelor of Engineering (Electronic) degree.

References 

Indian National Congress politicians

1978 births
Living people
Trinamool Congress politicians from Meghalaya